New Town is a neighborhood of Jacksonville, Florida. A primarily residential neighborhood, it is located in Jacksonville's Urban Core, immediately northwest of Downtown.

History
New Town was developed in the early 20th century for African-American workers in the railroads and industrial areas to the east, south and west. By the 21st century, the neighborhood show considerable signs of urban decay, with residents plagued by crime, failing schools, health problems, and endemic poverty. In 2008, Jacksonville mayor John Peyton and other parties established the New Town Success Zone, modeled after New York City's Harlem Children's Zone, which provides comprehensive social and educational programs and services to children in the neighborhood.

New Town is home to Edward Waters College, Florida's oldest historically black college.

Location
New Town is located in the city's Urban Core, immediately northwest of Downtown. It is bounded by King Street to the north, I-95 to the west, Seminary Street to the east, and Beaver Street to the south.

References

External links

New Town Success Zone

Neighborhoods in Jacksonville, Florida
Vernacular architecture in Florida
Westside, Jacksonville
Historic districts in Jacksonville